Hendrik Jacobus Gerber  (born 12 April 1976) is a South African former rugby union player.

Playing career
Gerber matriculated at Nico Malan High School and represented  at the annual Craven Week tournaments in 1993 and 1994 and was selected for the 1993 and 1994 South African Schools teams.

Gerber toured with the Springboks in 2000 to Argentina, Britain and Ireland and played in four tour matches. In 2003 he made his test match debut for the Springboks against  at Kings Park. He also played in the second test match against Scotland in 2003.

Test history

See also
List of South Africa national rugby union players – Springbok no. 709
List of South Africa national rugby sevens players

References

1976 births
Living people
South African rugby union players
South Africa international rugby union players
Western Province (rugby union) players
Stormers players
South Africa international rugby sevens players
Rugby union players from the Western Cape
Rugby union flankers